Libera Chat, stylized Libera.Chat, is an IRC network for free and open source software projects. It was founded on 19 May 2021 by former Freenode staff members, after Freenode was taken over by Andrew Lee, founder of Private Internet Access.

History

Freenode 

In 2017, Christel Dahlskjaer, then the head of staff at Freenode, incorporated a new company called Freenode Limited and transferred ownership to technology entrepreneur Andrew Lee. In February 2021, Dahlskjaer added the logo of Shells, a company co-founded by Lee, to the Freenode website. Following criticism from staff, Dahlskjaer resigned from the leadership of Freenode, and Freenode staff elected Tom Wesley as the new head of staff. Lee allegedly removed a blog post explaining the leadership changes and, on 11 May, appointed a new person to oversee the Freenode infrastructure. Freenode staff resigned en masse, and some published statements outlining their view of what happened and claiming that Lee had been applying legal pressure to Wesley.

Lee denied these claims, and said that he had provided Freenode with millions of dollars and was entitled to Freenode's servers as the owner of Freenode Limited. Lee also accused Wesley of harassing Dahlskjaer and of attempting a "hostile takeover."

Libera Chat 

After resigning from Freenode, the former staff created Libera Chat on 19 May 2021. They have described the network as a successor to Freenode, which they intend to focus around "free and open source software projects and similarly-spirited collaborative endeavours". Many major projects like Bitcoin, FrOSCon, Fedora, Ubuntu, Gentoo, FreeBSD, the Free Software Foundation and Wikimedia have since moved their channels from Freenode to Libera Chat and to other IRC networks.

References

External links 

 

Internet properties established in 2021
Internet Relay Chat networks
Free software
Organizations based in Sweden